Karen Moncrieff (born December 20, 1963, in Sacramento, California) is an American actress, director and screenwriter.  She is best known as the writer and director of critically acclaimed movies Blue Car and The Dead Girl .

Movies she has directed have won several awards. The Dead Girl won the Deauville American Film Festival's grand prize in 2007. The Keeping Hours won the Audience Award for Fiction Feature Film at the L.A. Film Fest in 2017.

Her directing credits are in both television and features, and she has acted in the soap operas Passions, Days of Our Lives and Santa Barbara. In 1985, she was crowned Miss Illinois and competed in the Miss America 1986 pageant. She graduated from Rochester Adams High School in 1982.

Filmography

References

External links

1963 births
Living people
20th-century American actresses
Actresses from Sacramento, California
Film producers from California
American television actresses
American television directors
American women film directors
Film directors from California
Miss America 1980s delegates
American women screenwriters
American women television directors
American women film producers
Screenwriters from California
21st-century American women